William Joseph Lull Young (June 27, 1943 – July 26, 2020) was an American professional football player who was an offensive tackle for ten seasons in the National Football League (NFL) for the New York Giants.  He played college football at Grambling State University.

Young signed with the Giants as a free agent in 1965 and stayed with the team throughout his career.  He played ten seasons, appearing in 135 games, mostly at left tackle, and starting 119 of those.

Young died on July 26th 2020.

His son, Rodney Young, also played in the NFL for the Giants.

References

External links
Pro Football Reference

1943 births
American football offensive tackles
Grambling State Tigers football players
2020 deaths
New York Giants players
Players of American football from Louisiana
Sportspeople from Ruston, Louisiana